The 1999–2000 NBA season was the Pistons' 52nd season in the National Basketball Association, and 43rd season in the city of Detroit. During the off-season, the Pistons re-signed free agents Terry Mills and Michael Curry. After the retirements of Joe Dumars and Bison Dele, the Pistons were led by Grant Hill and Jerry Stackhouse as they provided a 1-2 scoring punch, and were both selected for the 2000 NBA All-Star Game. The Pistons struggled losing their first four games, but then won 18 of their next 28 games, and held a 25–23 record at the All-Star break. At midseason, Don Reid was released to free agency, and later on signed with the Washington Wizards, while head coach Alvin Gentry was fired after a 28–30 start, and was replaced with assistant George Irvine. The Pistons won 14 of their next 24 games, and finished fourth in the Central Division with a 42–40 record.

Hill averaged 25.8 points, 6.6 rebounds, 5.2 assists and 1.4 steals per game, and was named to the All-NBA Second Team, while Stackhouse averaged 23.6 points and 1.3 steals per game, and Lindsey Hunter provided the team with 12.7 points and 1.6 steals per game. In addition, Christian Laettner provided with 12.2 points and 6.7 rebounds per game, while Jerome Williams played a sixth man role, averaging 8.4 points and 9.6 rebounds per game off the bench, and Mills contributed 6.7 points and 4.8 rebounds per game. Hill also finished in eighth place in Most Valuable Player voting, while Stackhouse finished in third place in Most Improved Player voting.

However, Hill suffered a devastating ankle injury in April, then re-injured his ankle during Game 2 of the Eastern Conference First Round of the playoffs against the Miami Heat. Without Hill, the Pistons lost Game 3 at home to the Heat, 91–72, thus losing the series. Following the season, Hill was traded to the Orlando Magic after six seasons in Detroit, while Hunter was traded to the Milwaukee Bucks, and Laettner and Mills were both dealt to the Dallas Mavericks, while Vaught was traded to the Mavericks in a separate trade. However, Mills was released by the Mavericks, and signed as a free agent with the Indiana Pacers.

For the season, the Pistons added new dark red alternate road uniforms with black side panels, which remained in use until 2001.

Draft picks

Roster

Regular season

Season standings

z - clinched division title
y - clinched division title
x - clinched playoff spot

Record vs. opponents

Playoffs

|- align="center" bgcolor="#ffcccc"
| 1
| April 22
| @ Miami
| L 85–95
| Jerry Stackhouse (23)
| Hill, Williams (9)
| Grant Hill (5)
| American Airlines Arena16,500
| 0–1
|- align="center" bgcolor="#ffcccc"
| 2
| April 25
| @ Miami
| L 82–84
| Jerry Stackhouse (26)
| Stackhouse, Williams (7)
| Grant Hill (4)
| American Airlines Arena16,500
| 0–2
|- align="center" bgcolor="#ffcccc"
| 3
| April 29
| Miami
| L 72–91
| Jerry Stackhouse (25)
| Christian Laettner (7)
| Jerry Stackhouse (3)
| The Palace of Auburn Hills14,507
| 0–3
|-

Player statistics

NOTE: Please write the players statistics in alphabetical order by last name.

Season

Playoffs

Awards and records
Grant Hill, All-NBA Second Team

Transactions

References

Detroit Pistons seasons
Detroit
Detroit
Detroit